Jesse Delong (1805–1868) was a farmer and political figure in Canada West.

He was born in South Crosby Township, Upper Canada in 1805, the son of George Delong, who settled there after leaving Vermont in 1795. He was the first reeve for South Crosby and was elected to the Legislative Assembly of the Province of Canada for South Leeds in 1854. Delong was a member of the township council for South Crosby at the time of his death in 1868.

His daughter Abigail married Lewis Chipman, who was superintendent of schools and township clerk for Bastard Township.

External links 
 Rideau Reflections, GC Churchill (1982)

1805 births
1868 deaths
Members of the Legislative Assembly of the Province of Canada from Canada West
Canadian people of American descent